Dave Watson (born 19 December 1946) is a former Australian cyclist. He competed in the team time trial at the 1968 Summer Olympics. Watson set the fastest time in the amateur Goulburn to Sydney Classic in 1969 run in reverse direction from Milperra to Goulburn.

References

External links
 

1946 births
Living people
Australian male cyclists
Olympic cyclists of Australia
Cyclists at the 1968 Summer Olympics
Place of birth missing (living people)
Cyclists at the 1970 British Commonwealth Games
Commonwealth Games competitors for Australia